Cameron Norrie (born 23 August 1995) is a British professional tennis player. He has reached career-high rankings of world No. 8 in singles (on 12 September 2022) and No. 117 in doubles (on 13 June 2022). He has won five ATP Tour singles titles (including a Masters 1000 title at the 2021 Indian Wells Masters) and one doubles title. Norrie has been the British No. 1 in men's singles since 18 October 2021. He previously represented New Zealand before 2013.

Early and personal life
Norrie was born in 1995 in Johannesburg, South Africa, to British microbiologist parents: his father David is from Glasgow and his mother Helen is from Cardiff. 
In 1998, when Norrie was three, he and his family moved to Auckland, New Zealand, after being victims of a burglary in South Africa. Norrie said: "I don't remember too much about it, but my mum told me it got a little bit too dangerous so we moved to New Zealand." His parents still live in New Zealand.
In 2011, at age 16, he moved to his parents' native United Kingdom, where he lived in London for three years before attending Texas Christian University in Fort Worth from 2014 to 2017.
In June 2017, he ended his studies at TCU to turn professional during the grass court season of the 2017 ATP Tour.

Since turning professional he has been based in Putney, southwest London (close to Wimbledon). When the Indian Wells Masters was cancelled in March 2020 at the beginning of the pandemic lockdowns, Norrie decided to fly to New Zealand to live with his parents for the rest of the year.

Cameron Norrie is a supporter of South Sydney Rabbitohs (Australian rugby league club), the New Zealand All Blacks national rugby union team, and Newcastle United Football Club.

Junior career
Norrie represented New Zealand as a junior, becoming No. 10 in the world, but received only a few thousand dollars from Tennis NZ, so his parents had to finance his overseas travel. At fifteen, he toured Europe for five months.

In April 2013, Norrie switched his allegiance at 17 to Great Britain, the nationality of both his parents, partly due to available funding, spending three years in London by himself. He lived and trained at the National Tennis Centre, later residing with a host family for two years while he continued his training. In 2013, he competed in all the Junior Grand Slams; the Australian Open for New Zealand, then for Great Britain at the French Open, Wimbledon and US Open, but only won one match, in Australia.

Norrie had difficulty on the European tennis circuit, so he considered training at an American university (Intercollegiate Tennis Association).

University career

2014–17
Norrie studied sociology on a sports scholarship at Texas Christian University (TCU) and joined the Horned Frogs university team, where he became the top-ranked male college tennis player in the US, being the first time that TCU had such an honour. In addition, Norrie was ranked All-American three times.

In the 2016–17 season, Norrie was the only player to win every Big 12 match he participated in, with a 10–0 record in singles and doubles. In spite of being seeded No 1, Norrie missed the end of season NCAA Championships and put a hold on his studies, so that he could turn professional.

Davis Cup
In 2018, Norrie won his debut Davis Cup match in Spain against world No. 23 Roberto Bautista Agut, despite only turning professional eight months previously, and last playing on clay in 2013. Norrie, ranked No. 114, came from two sets down, in what former Davis Cup captain John Lloyd said was "one of the most impressive debuts of all time".

Senior career

2013–15
In January 2013, Norrie played his first senior tournament at the ATP Auckland Open, winning the first qualifying round. Norrie played three clay-court events in 2013; the Great Britain Futures F9 second round and F11 quarterfinals, followed by the Boy's French Open first round. He didn't play another match on clay until the 2018 Davis Cup against Spain.

Turning 18, Norrie was ranked No. 1348 in August 2013, but a semifinal showing at the Canada Futures F6 improved his ranking to No. 973, rising to No. 637 by June 2014. Whilst studying at university, he played only sporadically on the tour, falling to No. 1114 in October 2015. On 11 October 2015, Norrie won the USA Futures F29 at Mansfield, Texas, and became ranked 706.

2016
Back-to-back titles at the USA Futures F21 and USA Futures F23 pushed him to No. 422 in July. A month later, at the all-British final of the Aptos Challenger, Norrie was beaten by Dan Evans and rose to No. 298.

Professional career

2017: ATP and Grand Slam debut
Norrie played three events in January, reaching the semifinal of the Maui Challenger to become world No 238. For the Davis Cup World Group match against France, Norrie joined the British team as a hitting partner. After completing three years of his four-year university course, Norrie turned professional in June, competing at the Surbiton and Nottingham Challengers, but still had a training base at TCU in Fort Worth.

Norrie made his ATP main-draw debut at the Aegon Championships, after receiving a wild card into the singles main draw, where he was defeated by Sam Querrey in the first round. Norrie earned his first ATP main-draw victory by beating Horacio Zeballos at Eastbourne, which was his first win over a top-50 player. 

Awarded a wildcard for the Wimbledon, Norrie was beaten by Jo-Wilfried Tsonga, the 12th seed, in the opening round. In July, Norrie won his first Challenger title at Binghamton, which had previously been won by Kyle Edmund in 2015, and Andy Murray in 2005.

He qualified for the main draw of the US Open, where he progressed to the second round.

The Cary Challenger final, followed by successive Challenger titles in Tiburon and Stockton, pushed Norrie to world No. 111 in October. In December, his Argentine coach Facundo Lugones arranged a four-week training camp in Buenos Aires, where Norrie hit with Juan Martin Del Potro and Diego Schwartzman.

2018: Top 100 debut and first ATP doubles title 
Norrie was seeded sixth in the qualifying draw for the Australian Open, but failed to advance into the main draw, losing to world No. 221 John-Patrick Smith. The following week, seeded fifth, he lost in the first round of the Newport Beach challenger event, losing to Michael Mmoh. In February, Norrie was selected for the Davis Cup team for the first time for Great Britain's World Group first round match against Spain. He recorded the biggest win of his career in his first match, coming from two sets down to defeat world No. 23 Roberto Bautista-Agut in five sets.

Norrie made his ATP main-draw debut at Delray Beach as a lucky loser. He lost in the first round to Hyeon Chung. He qualified for Acapulco, losing to world No. 6 Dominic Thiem in the first round in three tight sets. 
He qualified for his ATP World Tour Masters 1000 main-draw debut at the Indian Wells Masters in March 2018, but lost in the first round to Taro Daniel. He qualified for his second successive ATP World Tour Masters 1000 at the 2018 Miami Open, but lost to Nicolás Jarry in the first round.

His next main draw event was the Estoril Open. He lost in the second round to Roberto Carballés Baena. He teamed up with fellow Brit Kyle Edmund in doubles and won his maiden ATP Title, beating Wesley Koolhof and Artem Sitak. The pair did not drop a set the whole tournament. Norrie failed to qualify for the Italian Open, losing in the first round of the qualification draw to Federico Delbonis. At Lyon, he beat his first top 10 opponent, John Isner, and reached his first ATP Semifinal.

At the 2018 French Open Norrie was a direct entrant into a grand slam for the first time. He played Peter Gojowczyk in the opening round, and won after Gojowczyk retired through injury. In the second round he faced Frenchman Lucas Pouille on the Phillipe Chatrier court. Norrie eventually lost to the French number one in 5 sets, after darkness interrupted play at the end of the 4th set.

Cameron lost in the first round of the Nottingham challenger, Queens Club and Wimbledon. However, he did reach the quarter finals at Eastbourne, despite self-admittedly not being a big fan of the grass surface. After the early exit in 2018 Wimbledon, he succeeded to reach his second ATP Semifinal in 2018 BB&T Atlanta Open after beating Malek Jaziri, no.6 seed Jérémy Chardy and no.2 seed Nick Kyrgios. He then lost to Ryan Harrison in three sets, despite winning the first set. A week later he continued his good form on hard courts, by reaching the quarterfinal of 2018 Los Cabos Open.

2019: First ATP final, first ATP 500 semifinal, top 50 debut
Norrie received a wildcard into the main draw of the 2019 Auckland Open, in which he beat Benoît Paire, João Sousa, Taylor Fritz and Jan-Lennard Struff to reach his debut ATP final. He lost to Tennys Sandgren in straight sets. In the first round of the 2019 Australian Open, Norrie lost to Taylor Fritz in straight sets. Norrie then entered Acapulco, in which he beat Yoshihito Nishioka, fourth seed Diego Schwartzman and Mackenzie McDonald in order to reach his first ATP 500 semifinal. He lost to second seed Alexander Zverev in straight sets. As a result, he reached the top 50 for the first time in his career.

He reached the 3rd round of an ATP Masters 1000 event for the first time in his career at the 2019 Monte-Carlo Masters singles, where he beat Adrian Mannarino and Márton Fucsovics before he lost to qualifier Lorenzo Sonego. In the first round of the 2019 French Open men's singles, Norrie lost to qualifier Elliot Benchetrit in straight sets. At Wimbledon, Norrie reached the second round, losing to eighth seed Kei Nishikori in straight sets. He again reached the semifinals in Atlanta, again losing to Fritz, but this time in three sets.

Norrie lost to qualifier Grégoire Barrère in a five-set thriller at the US Open, losing in a tiebreaker in the fifth set. He reached the second round of the 2019 Zhuhai Championships, losing to Gaël Monfils in three sets. As the fourth seeded qualifier, Norrie beat He Yecong and Damir Džumhur to qualify. He reached the second round after Cristian Garín retired trailing one set and 1–0. He lost to Andy Murray in the second round in a highly competitive three-set match, losing 6–1 in the third.

Norrie qualified for the Shanghai Masters after beating Brayden Schnur and Thomas Fabbiano, and beat Gilles Simon to reach the second round, where he lost to third seed Daniil Medvedev in straight sets. At the 2019 European Open, Norrie lost to Feliciano López in straight sets. Norrie qualified for the Paris Masters, but lost to Milos Raonic in straight sets in the first round.

2020–21: First ATP & Masters title, British No. 1, Top 20 & ATP Finals debut
In the opening round of the 2020 US Open, Norrie upset the fifth seed Diego Schwartzman in a five set marathon. He then defeated Federico Coria before falling in the third round to Alejandro Davidovich Fokina, marking his best career result at a major. He matched this performance by reaching the same round at the 2021 Australian Open, where he was defeated by the world No. 2 Rafael Nadal.

Norrie reached his second ATP Tour singles final at the Estoril Open, defeating second seed Christian Garín and sixth seed Marin Čilić before losing to Albert Ramos Viñolas in the final. In May 2021, he achieved his biggest career win by beating world No. 4 Dominic Thiem at the Lyon Open. He continued by reaching the final after defeating eighth seed Karen Khachanov, where he was beaten by second seed Stefanos Tsitsipas. Norrie reached the third round of a major once again at the French Open, where he lost to Rafael Nadal in straight sets. At the Queen's Club Championships, he defeated world No. 24 Aslan Karatsev and Denis Shapovalov to reach the final, where he fell to Matteo Berrettini. With this run, he reached the top 40 in rankings for the first time, becoming the world No. 34. At Wimbledon, Norrie reached the third round of a major yet again, where he was defeated by the sixth seed Roger Federer in four sets.

Norrie won his first ATP title at the Los Cabos Open, beating Brandon Nakashima in the final. As a result, he entered the top 30 in rankings, at world No. 29 on 26 July 2021. In the Atlanta Open, Norrie defeated Nick Kyrgios in the first round before losing in straight sets to Emil Ruusuvuori. Norrie also paired with Taylor Fritz in the doubles, but lost in the first round to Matthew Ebden and John-Patrick Smith. At the 2021 Citi Open, he also entered the singles and doubles tournaments with Luke Saville, where he reached the round of 16 and the quarterfinals respectively.

At the US Open, Norrie was defeated in straight sets in the opening round by Carlos Alcaraz. In September, he was called as an alternate for the 2021 Laver Cup, but did not play. Norrie won his 40th match win of the season at the San Diego Open, defeating world No. 13 Denis Shapovalov. In the semifinals, Norrie came from a set down to defeat world No. 5 and top seed Andrey Rublev and reach his fifth final of the season. There, he was decisively defeated by Casper Ruud.

In October, Norrie reached his first Masters 1000 final at Indian Wells. Seeded 21st, he beat Tennys Sandgren, Roberto Bautista Agut and Tommy Paul. He then decisively defeated Diego Schwartzman to advance to the semifinals and surpass Dan Evans as the British No. 1 in men's singles. He beat Grigor Dimitrov in straight sets to advance to the final, where he came from a set and a break down to beat Nikoloz Basilashvili and win the title. Norrie entered the top 20 in rankings after the tournament.

At the Paris Masters, Norrie defeated Federico Delbonis for his 100th career win. He next defeated Reilly Opelka before falling to Taylor Fritz in the third round. Norrie's performance during the season earned him the second alternate spot at the ATP Finals. He entered the tournament as an alternate for Stefanos Tsitsipas after both Matteo Berrettini and Tsitsipas withdrew due to injuries. He played Casper Ruud and Novak Djokovic as part of the Green Group, but was defeated in both matches. Norrie ended the season as the world No. 12.

2022: Wimbledon semifinal, Top 10 debut

At the Delray Beach Open, Norrie dropped just one set en route to his third career singles title, defeating Reilly Opelka in the final.

Norrie reached his 9th ATP final in Acapulco, beating Daniel Altmaier, John Isner, Peter Gojowczyk and world No. 4 Stefanos Tsitsipas en route. He lost to current world No. 5 Rafael Nadal 6–4 6–4 in the final.

Norrie then entered Indian Wells as the defending champion. He defeated Nikoloz Basilashvili in the third round in a rematch of the previous year's final, and then eliminated Jenson Brooksby to reach the quarterfinals. There, he lost to 18 year-old Carlos Alcaraz in straight sets.

The following week at the Miami Open, Norrie lost in the fourth round to eventual finalist Casper Ruud. Following the tournament, Norrie ascended into the top 10 of the rankings for the first time on 4 April 2022.

Norrie won his fourth title in Lyon, beating Francisco Cerúndolo in straight sets, then Sebastián Báez, Holger Rune and Alex Molčan in three sets becoming the fifth player to win multiple tour-level titles in 2022. At the French Open, Norrie lost in the third round to Karen Khachanov in four sets.

At Wimbledon he reached the fourth round in a Grand Slam for the first time in his career, by beating Steve Johnson in three sets. Another three set win, over Tommy Paul, saw him through to the quarterfinals, after which he secured a place in the semifinals by defeating David Goffin in five sets. He lost to the top seed and eventual champion Novak Djokovic in four sets in the semifinals after being a set up.

On his way to US Open, Norrie played at the Canadian Open and  Western & Southern Open. He lost in the third round to Felix Auger Aliassime at the Canadian Open. At the Western & Southern Open he lost in the semifinals to Borna Coric. At the US Open, Norrie lost in the fourth round to Andrey Rublev in straight sets.

2023: Rio title and two Top-2 wins
Norrie started the season at the 2023 United Cup with two top-10 wins where he defeated world No. 2 Rafael Nadal and world No. 9 Taylor Fritz. 
Next he reached his twelfth final at the ASB Classic where he lost to Richard Gasquet. At the Australian Open, Norrie lost in the third round to Jiri Lehecka in a five set match. 

In February, during the Golden Swing Norrie reached his second final of the season at the 2023 Argentina Open where he lost to top seed Carlos Alcaraz.
Norrie made his second back to back final and his third of the year at the Rio Open. In the final, Cameron avenged his previous week loss by beating defending champion and top seed Carlos Alcaraz in three tight sets.

Playing style and coaching
With unorthodox but consistent groundstrokes, Norrie is a modern counter-puncher. The vast difference in style between his groundstroke swings is unique – his heavy topspin forehand with a long back-swing in contrast with the short take-back on his flat backhand. Norrie's strength lies in his shot tolerance and ability to neutralise pace and spin with good court positioning and speed. He lacks the raw power of many contemporary players, but excels at constructing points and frustrating opponents with consistent retrieval and injections of pace midway through rallies. Additionally, he possesses a solid net game and occasionally serve-and-volleys.

Norrie has had several different coaches. David Roditi (2014–2017), Devin Bowen (2014–2017), and since 2017 both James Trotman and Facundo Lugones.

Career statistics

Grand Slam tournament performance timeline 

Current through the 2023 Australian Open.

Significant finals

Masters 1000 finals

Singles: 1 (1 title)

References

External links

LTA profile

1995 births
Living people
British male tennis players
Scottish male tennis players
Tennis players from Johannesburg
British expatriate sportspeople in the United States
TCU Horned Frogs men's tennis players
New Zealand male tennis players
New Zealand emigrants to England
New Zealand people of Welsh descent
New Zealand people of Scottish descent
South African emigrants to New Zealand
South African emigrants to the United Kingdom
South African male tennis players
South African people of Welsh descent
South African people of Scottish descent
New Zealand expatriate sportspeople in England
South African expatriate sportspeople in England